Astragalus fasciculifolius is a species of milkvetch in the family Fabaceae.

References

fasciculifolius
Taxa named by Pierre Edmond Boissier